Microstoma (Greek "small mouth") may refer to genera:
 Microstoma (fish)
 Microstoma (fungus)
 Microstoma, a genus of hydrozoans in the family Pteronemidae, synonym of Pteronema
as well as a species:
 Macropinna microstoma, a fish, the only known species in its genus.